Housefires is an American worship band from Atlanta, Georgia. Forming in 2014, they have released five live albums.

Background
Housefires originated at Grace Midtown Church in Atlanta, Georgia. The church had released two prior worship albums as Grace Midtown, with Pat Barrett and others leading.  Housefires formed in 2014, with the addition of Kirby Kaple as a worship pastor at Grace, and signaled a shift in the church's musical style toward a more stripped-down style reminiscent of artists such as United Pursuit and All Sons & Daughters. Barrett and Kaple were joined by fellow Atlanta worship leader Tony Brown, and Grace Athens worship pastor Nate Moore. Additional members included violinist Vicki Schmidt, keyboardist Jonathan Jay, percussionist, Zac Brooks, and drummer Harold Brown.  In 2016, the band also participated in the Outcry Tour, and continued touring independently in 2017. They often host monthly worship nights at Grace Midtown's campus. On February 1, 2020, Donald Hart joined Housefires as their bassist.

Music history
The band has released four live albums. Their eponymous debut was released on March 19, 2014, with most songs reappearing in more polished form on Housefires II, released September 9, 2014. Housefires III followed on August 12, 2016, and their most recent album, We Say Yes, was released in mid-2017. The group is best known for Barrett and Brown's "Good Good Father," which attained massive popularity after Chris Tomlin recorded the song and released it as a single. Their album, Housefires III, charted on three Billboard magazine charts, The Billboard 200 at No. 106, Christian Albums at No. 3, and Independent Albums at No. 6.  It also charted on the Official Charts Company from the United Kingdom on their Official Christian & Gospel Albums Chart, at No. 2.

Members 

Current members
 Tony Brown – vocals, guitar
 Nate Moore – vocals, guitar
 Kirby Kaple – vocals
 Ryan Ellis – vocals, guitar
 Davy Flowers – vocals
 Vicki Schmidt – violin
 Jonathan Jay – keys
 Zac Brooks – percussion
 Harold Brown – drums
 Donald Hart – bass

Past members
 Pat Barrett – vocals, guitar
 Josh Stewart – keys
 Jonathan Kimsey – drums
 Mark Cole – guitar
 Blaine Keller – violin

Discography

Albums

Extended plays

Singles

References

External links

American Christian musical groups
Musical groups established in 2014
Performers of contemporary worship music
2014 establishments in Georgia (U.S. state)